Atef Salem (23 July 1927 – 30 July 2002) was an Egyptian film director. He directed 32 films between 1954 and 2001. Many of his films were scripted by the novelist Naguib Mahfouz. His 1967 film Khan el khalili was entered into the 5th Moscow International Film Festival.

Selected filmography
 Om El Arrousa (Mother of the Bride) (1963)
 A Wife from Paris (1966)
 Khan el khalili (1967)

References

External links

1927 births
2002 deaths
Egyptian film directors